Mike Urquhart (born ) is a Canadian retired ice hockey player, coach and general manager. He played for the Nottingham Panthers, Oxford City Stars, Chelmsford Chieftains, Guildford Flames, Bracknell Bees and Milton Keynes Kings during the 1980s and 1990s. He was inducted to the British Ice Hockey Hall of Fame in 2007.

Career statistics

References

 

1958 births
Ice hockey people from Toronto
Kamloops Chiefs players
Flin Flon Bombers players
Calgary Centennials players
British Ice Hockey Hall of Fame inductees
Canadian ice hockey left wingers
Guildford Flames players
Living people
Nottingham Panthers players
Nottingham Panthers coaches
Canadian expatriate ice hockey players in England